Main Squeeze is a 1976 jazz album by Chuck Mangione, as well as its titular song.

(The) Main Squeeze may also refer, in music, to: 
 The Main Squeeze, Indiana funk band
 The Main Squeeze (album) by Jimmy McGriff in 1974
 "Main Squeeze", 2005 reggae song by Lloyd Brown on Jet Star

See also
 "Mane Squeeze" on the hiphop album Keak Hendrix